Gestatten, mein Name ist Cox ("Good Evening, My Name Is Cox") is a series of crime novels and audio dramas written by the German couple  and , later also adapted to a television series and a movie. The series chronicle the adventures of Paul Cox, a professional gambler (antique dealer in the TV series) in London, with a tendency to get involved in intricate murder mysteries, where he often ends up as the main suspect and has to evade police and solve the crime to clear his name. He's aided in all his adventures by his friend Thomas Richardson, a private detective.

See also
List of German television series

External links
 

German radio dramas
Detective radio shows
1952 radio programme debuts
1978 radio programme endings
Radio programs adapted into television shows
German crime television series
1961 German television series debuts
1965 German television series endings
Television shows set in London
Television series based on radio series
German-language television shows
Das Erste original programming